Twenty-One is a 1918 silent film presumed lost. It was directed by William Worthington and starred Bryant Washburn and Gertrude Selby.

In this coming-of-age comedy drama, Washburn played the dual roles of a coddled rich kid and a tough prizefighter who trade places.

Washburn and Selby starred together again in Kidder & Ko.

Cast
Bryant Washburn - Jimmy Mufferton/'Battling' Dave Carey
Gertrude Selby - Dixie Charlton

References

External links

1918 films
American silent feature films
Lost American films
1918 comedy films
Silent American comedy films
American black-and-white films
1918 lost films
Lost comedy films
1910s American films
1910s English-language films
English-language comedy films